Shamsul Islam Khan (known as Naya Miah; died on 21 January 2006) was a Bangladesh Nationalist Party politician and a former Jatiya Sangsad member representing the Manikganj-4 constituency and a former minister of industries at the first Khaleda Zia cabinet.

Career
Khan served as the president of Abahani Limited Dhaka from 1978 to 1982. He was elected to Parliament in 1991 from Manikganj-4 as a candidate of Bangladesh Nationalist Party. From 1991 to 1996 he served as the Minister of Industries in the First Khaleda Zia Cabinet. He was elected in 2001 to parliament from Manikganj-4. He was elected four times from Manikganj-4 constituency.

Personal life
Khan died on 21 January 2006 in LabAid Cardiac Hospital, Dhaka.

Khan's son, Moinul Islam Khan, was made a member of former Prime Minister Khaleda Zia's advisory council on 7 August 2016. He had two daughters and one son.

References

2006 deaths
People from Manikganj District
Bangladesh Nationalist Party politicians
5th Jatiya Sangsad members
6th Jatiya Sangsad members
8th Jatiya Sangsad members
Industries ministers of Bangladesh
Date of birth missing
Place of birth missing